James Stuart Gordon, Baron Gordon of Strathblane,  (17 May 1936 – 31 March 2020) was a Scottish business executive and member of the House of Lords.

Early life
A kinsman of the Marquess of Huntly, he was the son of James Gordon and Elsie née Riach.

Gordon was educated at the St Aloysius' College, Glasgow and the University of Glasgow, where he graduated as a Master of Arts in Classics in 1958.

Business career
Gordon worked as a political editor for STV between 1965 and 1973, and as managing director of Radio Clyde between 1973 and 1996.

For Scottish Radio Holdings, Gordon was the Chief Executive from 1991 to 1996 and Chairman from 1996 to 2005; he was also Vice-Chairman of Melody Radio from 1991 to 1997, a director of Clydeport Holdings from 1992 to 1998 and Chairman of the Scottish Tourist Board from 1998 to 2001.  From 1990, Gordon was a member of the Scottish Advisory Board of British Petroleum, and since 1996 a director of Johnston Press plc as well as Chairman of AIM Trust plc (now Active Capital Trust).  He also served as Chairman of Radio Audience Research (RAJAR) from 2003.

Gordon was a member of the Scottish Development Agency between 1981 and 1990 and Chairman of the Scottish Exhibition and Conference Centre between 1983 and 1989.  He was a member of the court of the University of Glasgow from 1984 to 1997 and of the Committee of Enquiry into Teachers' Pay and Conditions in 1986. Lord Gordon joined the Scottish Tourist Board in 1997, serving as its Chairman between 1998 and 2001. From 1997 to 1998, Gordon was also Chairman of the Advisory Group on Listed Events, and from 1998 to 1999, a member of the Independent Review Panel on Funding of BBC and then from 1998 to 2001 board member of the British Tourist Authority.

Political career
At the 1964 general election Gordon contested East Renfrewshire for Labour. Gordon was further a Trustee of the National Galleries of Scotland between 1998 and 2001 and a Trustee of the John Smith Memorial Trust from 1995. From 1995 to 1997 he was Chairman of the Glasgow Common Purpose organization.

Appointed CBE in HM 1984 Birthday Honours, Gordon later received a Sony Award for his outstanding services to radio. On 4 October 1997, he was created a Life Peer taking the title Baron Gordon of Strathblane, of Deil's Craig in Stirlingshire. Elected a Fellow of the Radio Academy in 1994, Lord Gordon then received the Lord Provost's Award for Public Service as well as honorary degrees as Doctor of Letters (Hon DLitt) from the Glasgow Caledonian University, and Doctor of the University (DUniv) from the University of Glasgow in 1998.

Personal life
Gordon married Margaret Anne Stevenson in 1971, by whom he had a daughter and two sons.

Gordon died on 31 March 2020 at Glasgow Royal Infirmary after contracting COVID-19. In a tribute, the Radio Academy of Scotland called him the 'Father of Scottish radio.'

See also

House of Lords
Burke's Peerage & Baronetage

References

Sources
 

1936 births
2020 deaths
People from Stirling
People educated at St Aloysius' College, Glasgow
Alumni of Glasgow Caledonian University
Alumni of the University of Glasgow
Gordon of Strathblane
Life peers created by Elizabeth II
Deaths from the COVID-19 pandemic in Scotland
Commanders of the Order of the British Empire
Scottish chief executives